Friedrich August Kekulé, later Friedrich August Kekule von Stradonitz (7 September 1829 – 13 July 1896), was a German organic chemist. From the 1850s until his death, Kekulé was one of the most prominent chemists in Europe, especially in theoretical chemistry. He was the principal founder of the theory of chemical structure and in particular the Kekulé structure of benzene.

Name
Kekulé never used his first given name; he was known throughout his life as August Kekulé. After he was ennobled by the Kaiser in 1895, he adopted the name August Kekule von Stradonitz, without the French acute accent over the second "e". The French accent had apparently been added to the name by Kekulé's father during the Napoleonic occupation of Hesse by France, to ensure that French-speakers pronounced the third syllable.

Early years
The son of a civil servant, Kekulé was born in Darmstadt, the capital of the Grand Duchy of Hesse. After graduating from secondary school (the Grand Ducal Gymnasium in Darmstadt), in the fall of 1847 he entered the University of Giessen, with the intention of studying architecture. After hearing the lectures of Justus von Liebig in his first semester, he decided to study chemistry. Following four years of study in Giessen and a brief compulsory military service, he took temporary assistantships in Paris (1851–52), in Chur, Switzerland (1852–53), and in London (1853–55), where he was decisively influenced by Alexander Williamson. His Giessen doctoral degree was awarded in the summer of 1852.

Theory of chemical structure
In 1856, Kekulé became Privatdozent at the University of Heidelberg. In 1858, he was hired as full professor at the University of Ghent, then in 1867 he was called to Bonn, where he remained for the rest of his career. Basing his ideas on those of predecessors such as Williamson, Charles Gerhardt, Edward Frankland, William Odling, Auguste Laurent, Charles-Adolphe Wurtz and others, Kekulé was the principal formulator of the theory of chemical structure (1857–58). This theory proceeds from the idea of atomic valence, especially the tetravalence of carbon (which Kekulé announced late in 1857) and the ability of carbon atoms to link to each other (announced in a paper published in May 1858), to the determination of the bonding order of all of the atoms in a molecule. Archibald Scott Couper independently arrived at the idea of self-linking of carbon atoms (his paper appeared in June 1858), and provided the first molecular formulas where lines symbolize bonds connecting the atoms. For organic chemists, the theory of structure provided dramatic new clarity of understanding, and a reliable guide to both analytic and especially synthetic work. As a consequence, the field of organic chemistry developed explosively from this point. Among those who were most active in pursuing early structural investigations were, in addition to Kekulé and Couper, Frankland, Wurtz, Alexander Crum Brown, Emil Erlenmeyer, and Alexander Butlerov.

Kekulé's idea of assigning certain atoms to certain positions within the molecule, and schematically connecting them using what he called their "Verwandtschaftseinheiten" ("affinity units", now called "valences" or "bonds"), was based largely on evidence from chemical reactions, rather than on instrumental methods that could peer directly into the molecule, such as X-ray crystallography. Such physical methods of structural determination had not yet been developed, so chemists of Kekulé's day had to rely almost entirely on so-called "wet" chemistry. Some chemists, notably Hermann Kolbe, heavily criticized the use of structural formulas that were offered, as he thought, without proof. However, most chemists followed Kekulé's lead in pursuing and developing what some have called "classical" structure theory, which was modified after the discovery of electrons (1897) and the development of quantum mechanics (in the 1920s).

The idea that the number of valences of a given element was invariant was a key component of Kekulé's version of structural chemistry. This generalization suffered from many exceptions, and was subsequently replaced by the suggestion that valences were fixed at certain oxidation states. For example, periodic acid according to Kekuléan structure theory could be represented by the chain structure I-O-O-O-O-H. By contrast, the modern structure of (meta) periodic acid has all four oxygen atoms surrounding the iodine in a tetrahedral geometry.

Benzene

Kekulé's most famous work was on the structure of benzene. In 1865 Kekulé published a paper in French (for he was then still in Belgium) suggesting that the structure contained a six-membered ring of carbon atoms with alternating single and double bonds. The following year he published a much longer paper in German on the same subject.

The empirical formula for benzene had been long known, but its highly unsaturated structure was a challenge to determine. Archibald Scott Couper in 1858 and Joseph Loschmidt in 1861 suggested possible structures that contained multiple double bonds or multiple rings, but the study of aromatic compounds was in its earliest years, and too little evidence was then available to help chemists decide on any particular structure.

More evidence was available by 1865, especially regarding the relationships of aromatic isomers. Kekulé argued for his proposed structure by considering the number of isomers observed for derivatives of benzene. For every monoderivative of benzene (C6H5X, where X = Cl, OH, CH3, NH2, etc.) only one isomer was ever found, implying that all six carbons are equivalent, so that substitution on any carbon gives only a single possible product. For diderivatives such as the toluidines, C6H4(NH2)(CH3), three isomers were observed, for which Kekulé proposed structures with the two substituted carbon atoms separated by one, two and three carbon-carbon bonds, later named ortho, meta, and para isomers respectively.

The counting of possible isomers for diderivatives was, however, criticized by Albert Ladenburg, a former student of Kekulé, who argued that Kekulé's 1865 structure implied two distinct "ortho" structures, depending on whether the substituted carbons are separated by a single or a double bond. Since ortho derivatives of benzene were never actually found in more than one isomeric form, Kekulé modified his proposal in 1872 and suggested that the benzene molecule oscillates between two equivalent structures, in such a way that the single and double bonds continually interchange positions. This implies that all six carbon-carbon bonds are equivalent, as each is single half the time and double half the time. A firmer theoretical basis for a similar idea was later proposed in 1928 by Linus Pauling, who replaced Kekulé's oscillation by the concept of resonance between quantum-mechanical structures.

Kekulé's dream 

The new understanding of benzene, and hence of all aromatic compounds, proved to be so important for both pure and applied chemistry after 1865 that in 1890 the German Chemical Society organized an elaborate appreciation in Kekulé's honor, celebrating the twenty-fifth anniversary of his first benzene paper. Here Kekulé spoke of the creation of the theory. He said that he had discovered the ring shape of the benzene molecule after having a reverie or day-dream of a snake seizing its own tail (this is an ancient symbol known as the ouroboros). This is likely an example of the exercise of a particular imaginative state, involving homospatial and janusian processes, followed by stepwise logical thinking.

A similar humorous depiction of benzene had appeared in 1886 in the Berichte der Durstigen Chemischen Gesellschaft (Journal of the Thirsty Chemical Society), a parody of the Berichte der Deutschen Chemischen Gesellschaft, only the parody had six monkeys seizing each other in a circle, rather than a single snake as in Kekulé's anecdote. Some historians have suggested that the parody was a lampoon of the snake anecdote, possibly already well-known through oral transmission even if it had not yet appeared in print. Others have speculated that Kekulé's story in 1890 was a re-parody of the monkey spoof, and was a mere invention rather than a recollection of an event in his life.

Kekulé's 1890 speech, in which these anecdotes appeared, has been translated into English. If one takes the anecdote as reflecting an accurate memory of a real event, circumstances mentioned in the story suggest that it must have happened early in 1862. 

He told another autobiographical anecdote in the same 1890 speech, of an earlier vision of dancing atoms and molecules that led to his theory of structure, published in May 1858. This happened, he claimed, while he was riding on the upper deck of a horse-drawn omnibus in London. Once again, if one takes the anecdote as reflecting an accurate memory of a real event, circumstances related in the anecdote suggest that it must have occurred in the late summer of 1855.

Works

Honors

In 1895, Kekulé was ennobled by Kaiser Wilhelm II of Germany, giving him the right to add "von Stradonitz" to his name, referring to a possession of his patrilineal ancestors in Stradonice, Bohemia. His name thus became Friedrich August Kekule von Stradonitz, without the French accent on the last "e" of his name, and this is the form of the name that some libraries use.  This title was inherited by his son, genealogist Stephan Kekule von Stradonitz. Of the first five Nobel Prizes in Chemistry, Kekulé's former students won three: van 't Hoff in 1901, Fischer in 1902 and Baeyer in 1905.

A larger-than-life monument of Kekulé, unveiled in 1903, is situated in front of the former Chemical Institute (completed 1868) at the University of Bonn. His statue is often humorously decorated by students, e.g. for Valentine's Day or Halloween.

See also
Non-Kekulé molecule
Skeletal formula
Kekulé Program
Auguste Laurent

References

Further reading
 Benfey, O. Theodor. "August Kekule and the Birth of the Structural Theory of Organic Chemistry in 1858." Journal of Chemical Education. Volume 35, No. 1, January 1958. p. 21–23. – Includes an English translation of Kekule's 1890 speech in which he spoke about his development of structure theory and benzene theory.
 Rocke, A. J., Image and Reality: Kekule, Kopp, and the Scientific Imagination (University of Chicago Press, 2010).

External links

 Kekulés Traum (Kekulé's dream, in German)
 Kekulé: A Scientist and a Dreamer
 

1829 births
1896 deaths
19th-century German chemists
Scientists from Darmstadt
People from the Grand Duchy of Hesse
Organic chemists
German untitled nobility
University of Giessen alumni
Academic staff of the University of Bonn
Recipients of the Copley Medal
Foreign Members of the Royal Society
Foreign associates of the National Academy of Sciences
Corresponding members of the Saint Petersburg Academy of Sciences
Recipients of the Pour le Mérite (civil class)